ATK Mohun Bagan Football Club is a professional association football club based in Kolkata, India, that plays in Indian Super League.

List of players

Appearances and goals are for Indian Super League and Super Cup  matches only.
Players are listed according to the date of their first team debut for the club. Only players with at least one appearance are included.

Statistics correct as of 28 August 2020

Table headers
 Nationality – If a player played international football, the country/countries he played for are shown. Otherwise, the player's nationality is given as their country of birth.
 Career span – The year of the player's first appearance for ATK Mohun Bagan  to the year of his last appearance.
 Matches – The total number of games played, both as a starter and as a substitute.

References

Lists of Indian Super League players
ATK Mohun Bagan FC players
Lists of association football players by club in India

 

Association football player non-biographical articles